WGMF is an AM broadcasting radio station licensed to the city of Nanticoke, Pennsylvania, and serves the Wilkes-Barre, Scranton, and Hazleton radio markets with a classic hits format, switching from adult standards and Tropical and Spanish language adult contemporary format  in December 2008. The station simulcasts sister WGMM located in Tunkhannock, Pennsylvania. 

WGMF broadcasts at a frequency of 730 kHz with 1,000 watts of power during the daytime with a non-directional antenna. During the nighttime hours, the station must reduce its power substantially to 12 watts which limits its listen able area to just the local Nanticoke area. The power reduction at nighttime is required by rules set by the Federal Communications Commission in order to avoid interference from CKAC, a Canadian Class A radio station also on 730 kHz. WGMF also broadcasts at a frequency of 104.5 MHz with 27 watts of power from a site atop Dewey/West Mtn near Keyser Valley/Scranton, Pennsylvania, which covers Scranton, Old Forge, Avoca, Dickson City, Pittston, and Jessup, Pennsylvania. WGMF also broadcasts at a frequency of 92.5 MHz with 250 watts of power from a site atop Penobscot Mountain near Mountain Top, Pennsylvania, which covers Wilkes-Barre, Mountain Top, Wyoming, Nanticoke, Hazleton, Dallas, West Pittston, and Kingston, Pennsylvania.

History
The radio station has its origins as WHWL, the last three letters standing for the initials of Henry W. Lark, the station's former owner. The station then changed hands and was owned by Radio Anthracite, Inc. with the call signs changing along the way to WNAK. The station changed ownership in 1958 to Attorney Martin Phillips and Wyoming Radio, Inc. In 1965, Bob Neilson, Charmaine Grove, and accountant Harold Detwiler (to be known collectively as Seven-Thirty Broadcasters, Inc.) purchased radio station WNAK from Attorney Martin Phillips and Wyoming Radio, Inc. During the 1980s, WNAK started broadcasting with the Kahn-Hazeltine AM stereo system, the only northeastern Pennsylvania AM broadcasting station to use the system.

In 2003, Seven-Thirty Broadcasters and WNAK were acquired by Route 81 Radio, based in West Chester, PA. From 2004 until 2006, WNAK was simulcast on the former WNAK-FM located in Carbondale, Pennsylvania at 94.3 MHz. WNAK-FM is now known as "94.3 FM The Talker" and broadcasts a talk format with the call letters WTRW. In 2005, WNAK was honored by the National Association of Broadcasters as the adult standards format station of the year in Pennsylvania. The station switched from an adult standards format on October 15, 2007, to Spanish language programming simulcasting sister station WCDL, "Caliente (Hot) 1440", from Carbondale, Pennsylvania.

The station's programming as "Caliente" was a mix of locally produced shows from 7 a.m. to 5 p.m. weekdays followed by syndicated shows from Bustos Broadcasting.

It was announced in early December 2008 that WNAK, along with sister station WCDL, would be returning to a standards format. Newspaper ads have used the slogan "The Greatest Music of All Time" and have featured photos of singers such as Frank Sinatra, Tony Bennett, Dean Martin and Peggy Lee. The station changed its call sign to WZMF on April 23, 2010. WZMF switched to a simulcast of the-then 1460 kHz WGMF on May 5, 2010, airing a classic hits/oldies format. On July 4, 2018, WZMF and WGMF swapped call signs.

In February 2023 WGMF rebranded as "Gem 99 & 100".

Translators

Previous logo
 (WGMF's logo under former "Gem 104" branding)

References

External links

GMF (AM)
Radio stations established in 1947
1947 establishments in Pennsylvania
Classic hits radio stations in the United States